Paikiasothy Saravanamuttu Stadium is a sports ground in Colombo, the capital of Sri Lanka. It is the home ground of Tamil Union Cricket and Athletic Club and has been the venue for top-level international cricket matches since 1982. The first Test match played by Sri Lanka took place on the ground; England were the opponents in February of that year. The first One Day International played on the ground took place in 1983 and the first Twenty20 International on the ground was played in 2010.

In cricket, a five-wicket haul (also known as a "five-for" or "fifer") refers to a bowler taking five or more wickets in a single innings. This is regarded as a notable achievement. This article details the five-wicket hauls taken on the ground in official international Test and One Day International matches.

The first bowler to take a five-wicket haul in an international match on the ground was England's Derek Underwood who took five wickets at the cost of 28 runs (5/28) in the first Test match played on the ground. The best innings bowling figures in Test cricket on the ground are 7/94, taken by Australia's Shane Warne against Pakistan in October 2002. The only bowler to take a five-wicket haul in a One Day International on the ground was India's Ekta Bisht who took 5/8 in a match in the 2017 Women's Cricket World Cup Qualifier against Pakistan

Key

Test match five-wicket hauls

A total of 26 five-wicket hauls have been taken in Test matches on the ground.

One Day International five-wicket hauls

A single five-wicket haul has been taken on the ground on One Day International cricket.

Notes

References

External links
International five-wicket hauls at P Sara Oval, CricInfo

Paikiasothy Saravanamuttu Stadium
five-wicket hauls at Paikiasothy Saravanamuttu Stadium